Elina Sofokleous (born 1 November 1978) is a Cypriot cyclist. She competed in the women's cross-country mountain biking event at the 2004 Summer Olympics.

References

1978 births
Living people
Cypriot female cyclists
Olympic cyclists of Cyprus
Cyclists at the 2004 Summer Olympics
Place of birth missing (living people)